Albert Leslie Williams (1 May 1905 – 1974) was a Welsh professional footballer who played as a winger. He made appearances in the English Football League for Wrexham, Gillingham and York City.

He also made non-league appearances for Chester City and Burton Town

References

1905 births
1974 deaths
Welsh footballers
Association football midfielders
English Football League players
Druids United F.C. players
Wrexham A.F.C. players
Chester City F.C. players
Wolverhampton Wanderers F.C. players
Gillingham F.C. players
York City F.C. players
Burton Town F.C. players